Rafael Surillo Ruiz is a Puerto Rican politician and the current mayor of Yabucoa. Served as vice mayor of Yabucoa from 1997 to 2000. he is affiliated with the Popular Democratic Party (PPD) and has served as mayor since 2013.

References

1963 births
Living people
Mayors of places in Puerto Rico
Popular Democratic Party (Puerto Rico) politicians
People from Yabucoa, Puerto Rico